Drew Ferguson is a former Canadian soccer player. He was born in Powell River, British Columbia, Canada on November 9, 1957.

Early life
He began playing soccer when he was five years old with the Powell River Lions. He also excelled in track and field, setting a record running the fastest mile for a 10-year-old in the world at 5:33.34. When he was 15, he participated in a soccer camp, where Jack Charlton was a guest coach, who brought him to train with Leeds United, and lived with him.

Club career
Ferguson received initial attention during the 1977 Canada Games where he scored in the final championship game. He started his North American Soccer League career with a single appearance for the Vancouver Whitecaps in 1978, but went on to appear in 80 games for the Edmonton Drillers from 1979 to 1982.

Over his 13 year career, Ferguson would go on to play for in Canada, the United States and England, playing for the Vancouver Whitecaps, Edmonton Drillers, Burton Albion, Hamilton Steelers, Kitchener Spirit/Kickers and indoor soccer with Buffalo Stallions, Cleveland Force, New York Cosmos, Chicago Sting,  and Cleveland Crunch. During this time, he was named MVP three times.

International career
Ferguson did not make his first appearance for the Canadian national soccer team until he was 27 years old in a 2–1 win over Trinidad and Tobago in Port of Spain in 1985. He made six appearances in friendly matches in 1985 but was not recalled again until 1989. His final cap came in a 0–2 defeat in a March 1991 North American Nations Cup match against the United States in Torrance, California.

International goals
Scores and results list Canada's goal tally first.

Managerial career
Ferguson served as the head coach and general manager for the Kitchener Spirit of the Canadian Soccer League in 1991,

He currently serves as the coach for the Canadian Para soccer team.

References

1957 births
Association football defenders
Association football midfielders
Buffalo Stallions players
Canadian people of Scottish descent
Canadian soccer coaches
Canadian soccer players
Canada men's international soccer players
Canadian expatriate soccer players
Canadian expatriate sportspeople in the United States
Canadian Soccer League (1987–1992) players
Chicago Sting (MISL) players
Cleveland Force (original MISL) players
Cleveland Crunch (original MISL) players
Edmonton Drillers (1979–1982) players
Expatriate soccer players in the United States
Hamilton Steelers (1981–1992) players
Living people
New York Cosmos (MISL) players
North American Soccer League (1968–1984) players
North American Soccer League (1968–1984) indoor players
Major Indoor Soccer League (1978–1992) players
People from Powell River, British Columbia
Soccer people from British Columbia
Vancouver Whitecaps (1974–1984) players
Ottawa Intrepid players
Edmonton Brick Men players
Kitchener Spirit players